Fernando Mendes may refer to:

 Fernando Mendes (cyclist) (1946–2001), Portuguese cyclist 
 Fernando Mendes (footballer born 1937) (1937–2016), Portuguese football midfielder and manager
 Fernando Mendes (footballer born 1966), Portuguese retired footballer who played as a left defender